Jorge Remes Lenicov (born 1948) is an Argentine economist and politician who served as Minister of Economy and Production from January 3 till April 27, 2002.

His short term was unpopular. President Eduardo Duhalde had inherited a bankrupt country. Remes Lenicov decided on an extreme freezing of the bank deposits, which was then coupled with the so-called pesificación ("peso-ification", a forced transformation of all dollar-denominated accounts into pesos at an arbitrary fixed exchange rate), and a regulated devaluation. The fixed exchange rate system was abandoned soon afterwards, which was followed by a large depreciation.

Afterwards Remes Lenicov served as Argentine ambassador to the European Union till 2011.

References

1948 births
Argentine people of Russian descent
People from La Plata
National University of La Plata alumni
Argentine economists
Justicialist Party politicians
Argentine Ministers of Finance
Living people